Patrick Tate (born May 19, 1987 in Charlotte, North Carolina) is an American soccer player who last played for Charleston Battery in the USL Second Division.

Career

Youth and College
Tate attended South Mecklenburg High School and played one season of college soccer at East Carolina University before transferring to the University of North Carolina at Asheville as a sophomore when East Carolina dropped their soccer program. At UNC Asheville Tate finished his career with four goals and two assists, earning second-team all-conference honors as a senior.

Professional
Tate was signed to his first professional contract by the Charleston Battery after impressing head coach Michael Anhaeuser during a pre-season trial.

Tate did not make a first team appearance for Charleston in his rookie pro season, but was loaned out to the Wilmington Hammerheads of the USL Second Division for part of the year; it was for the Hammerheads that Tate made his professional debut on June 27, 2009 in a 3–2 win over the Harrisburg City Islanders.

He was not included on the 2011 roster release by Charleston on April 7, 2011.

References

External links
 Charleston Battery bio
 UNC Asheville bio

Living people
1987 births
East Carolina University alumni
University of North Carolina at Asheville alumni
Charleston Battery players
Wilmington Hammerheads FC players
USL First Division players
USL Second Division players
Association football defenders
American soccer players
East Carolina Pirates men's soccer players
UNC Asheville Bulldogs men's soccer players